Unión is a town and district in the San Pedro Department, Paraguay.

Sources 
World Gazeteer: Paraguay – World-Gazetteer.com Broken link.

Populated places in the San Pedro Department, Paraguay